Giacomo Prestia (born August 22, 1960 in Florence) is an Italian operatic bass,

A native of Florence (Italy), Giacomo Prestia studied vocal technique with Maestro Sergio Catoni. He won international competitions including the "Concorso internazionale Voci Verdiane" in Busseto and the "Concorso Luciano Pavarotti" in Philadelphia.

He made his opera debut with Giuseppe Verdi's Alzira in Fidenza in 1990. He performs in Teatro alla Scala, Maggio Musicale Fiorentino, Opéra National de Paris, Wiener Staatsoper, Opernhaus Zurich, Teatro Real de Madrid, Liceu de Barcelona, Staatsoper Unter den Linden and Deutsche Oper Berlin, Teatro Colón de Buenos Aires, Teatro Comunale in Bologna, San Carlo in Naples, Berlin Philharmonic, Teatro Regio di Parma. He has worked with Claudio Abbado, Zubin Mehta, Riccardo Muti, Georges Prêtre, Daniele Gatti, Nicola Luisotti.

Repertory
Beethoven
Missa solemnis
Vincenzo Bellini
I puritani
La sonnambula
Gaetano Donizetti
La favorita
Don Pasquale
Messa da requiem
Gounod
Faust
Massenet
Don Quichotte
Meyerbeer
Gli ugonotti
Amilcare Ponchielli
La Gioconda
Gioachino Rossini
Il barbiere di Siviglia
Stabat Mater
Giuseppe Verdi
Aida
Attila
Don Carlos
Ernani
La forza del destino
I Lombardi alla prima crociata
Macbeth
I masnadieri
Messa da Requiem
Simon Boccanegra
I vespri siciliani

References

External links
 Official website

1960 births
Living people
Musicians from Florence
Operatic basses
20th-century Italian male opera singers
21st-century Italian male opera singers